Peay may refer to:

Austin Peay (1876–1927), Governor of Tennessee from 1923 until his death in 1927
Clint Peay (born 1973), retired U.S. soccer defender and head coach
Francis Peay (born 1944), retired American football offensive tackle and head coach
J. H. Binford Peay III (born 1940), retired four-star General from the United States Army

See also
Austin Peay State University, accredited public university located in Clarksville, Tennessee
Austin Peay Governors and Lady Govs, the above school's athletic program
Preah Peay Phat, 1971 Khmer film directed by Ly You Sreang starring Kong Som Eun and Vichara Dany
Tropeang Peay, 1970 Khmer film starring Kong Som Eun and Vichara Dany